Falih Akram Fahmi (1940 – 25 January 1989) was an Iraqi sprinter. He competed in the men's 200 metres and men's 4 × 100 metres relay at the 1960 Summer Olympics. He was executed for insulting Saddam Hussein.

References

External links
 

1940 births
1989 deaths
Athletes (track and field) at the 1960 Summer Olympics
Iraqi male sprinters
Olympic athletes of Iraq
20th-century executions by Iraq
Sportspeople from Baghdad
Iraqi torture victims